Estadio General Ángel Flores was a stadium in Culiacán, Mexico.  It was primarily used for baseball and served as the home stadium for Tomateros de Culiacán.  It also hosted the 2001 Caribbean Series.  The stadium opened in 1948  and demolition of the structure began and was completed in January 2015, right after the final game where Tomateros defeated Charros de Jalisco to win 2014–15 season title. The Tomateros now play in the New Tomateros Stadium, with a capacity of 19,200, which was ready for the 2015–16 season.

References

1948 establishments in Mexico
Baseball venues in Mexico
Sports venues completed in 1948
Sports venues in Sinaloa